The 2022/23 FIS Ski Jumping Continental Cup was the 32nd (29th official) Continental Cup winter season in ski jumping for men and the 19th for women. This is also the 21st summer continental cup season for men and 14th for women.

Other competitive circuits this season include the World Cup, Grand Prix, FIS Cup, Alpen Cup and New Star Trophy.

Map of Continental Cup hosts 
All 16 locations hosting Continental Cup events for men (4 summer / 11 winter), for women (2 summer / 5 winter) and shared (6) in this season.

 Men 
 Women 
 Shared

Men

Calendar

Summer

Winter

Standings

Summer

Winter

Women

Calendar

Summer

Winter

Standings

Summer

Winter

Podium table by nation 
Table showing the World Cup podium places (gold–1st place, silver–2nd place, bronze–3rd place) by the countries represented by the athletes.

Notes

References 

FIS Ski Jumping Continental Cup
2022 in ski jumping
2023 in ski jumping